Luka Maros (born 20 March 1994) is a Swiss handball player for Kadetten Schaffhausen and the Swiss national team.

He represented Switzerland at the 2020 European Men's Handball Championship.

References

1994 births
Living people
Swiss male handball players
Sportspeople from Zürich